Agobardus is a genus of jumping spiders that was first described by Eugen von Keyserling in 1885.

Species
 it contains sixteen species and one subspecies, found only in the Caribbean:
Agobardus anormalis Keyserling, 1885 (type) – Caribbean
Agobardus a. montanus Bryant, 1943 – Hispaniola
Agobardus bahoruco Zhang & Maddison, 2012 – Hispaniola
Agobardus blandus Bryant, 1947 – Puerto Rico
Agobardus brevitarsus Bryant, 1943 – Hispaniola
Agobardus cordiformis Zhang & Maddison, 2012 – Hispaniola
Agobardus cubanus (Bryant, 1940) – Cuba
Agobardus fimbriatus Bryant, 1940 – Cuba
Agobardus gramineus Zhang & Maddison, 2012 – Hispaniola
Agobardus minutus (Bryant, 1940) – Cuba
Agobardus modestus (Bryant, 1943) – Hispaniola
Agobardus mundus Bryant, 1940 – Cuba
Agobardus obscurus Bryant, 1943 – Hispaniola
Agobardus oveido Zhang & Maddison, 2012 – Hispaniola
Agobardus perpilosus Bryant, 1943 – Hispaniola
Agobardus phylladiphilus Zhang & Maddison, 2012 – Hispaniola
Agobardus prominens Bryant, 1940 – Cuba

References

Salticidae
Salticidae genera
Spiders of the Caribbean
Arthropods of the Dominican Republic
Taxa named by Eugen von Keyserling